Absa Diop (born 28 April 1984) is a Senegalese footballer who plays as a defender. She has been a member of the Senegal women's national team.

International career
Diop capped for Senegal at senior level during the 2012 African Women's Championship.

References

1984 births
Living people
Women's association football defenders
Senegalese women's footballers
Senegal women's international footballers